Sing Me Softly of the Blues is an album by Art Farmer's Quartet recorded in 1965, and released on the Atlantic label.

Reception
The Allmusic review awarded the album 3 stars.

Track listing
 "Sing Me Softly of the Blues" (Carla Bley) - 6:44    
 "Ad Infinitum" (Bley) - 6:21    
 "Petite Belle" (Traditional) - 4:08    
 "Tears" (Pete LaRoca) - 5:45    
 "I Waited for You" (Walter Gil Fuller) - 5:55    
 "One for Majid" (LaRoca) - 5:57

Personnel
Art Farmer - flugelhorn
Steve Kuhn - piano
Steve Swallow - bass
Pete LaRoca - drums

References 

Atlantic Records albums
Art Farmer albums
1965 albums
Albums produced by Arif Mardin